William Prescott Jr. (October 19, 1762 in Pepperell, Massachusetts – December 8, 1844 in Boston, Massachusetts) was a representative from Massachusetts to the 1814–15 Hartford Convention.

Biography
Prescott was the only child of American Revolution leader Colonel William Prescott, who served at Bunker Hill in 1775.  William Prescott Jr., graduated from Harvard in 1783, and then taught at Brooklyn, Connecticut, and later at Beverly, Massachusetts. He passed the bar exam in 1787 after studying law in Beverly with Nathan Dane.

Prescott founded a law practice in Beverly.  In 1789, he moved his practice to Salem, Massachusetts, where he became a well-known attorney. He represented Salem for several years in the Massachusetts Legislature. He was elected a state senator by the Federal party for Essex County, first in 1806, and again in 1813. He twice declined a seat on the bench of the Supreme Court of Massachusetts. In 1808 he moved to Boston, and was for several years a member of the Governor's Council.

Prescott was elected as a representative to the 1814 secessionist Hartford Convention. In 1815, he was elected a Fellow of the American Academy of Arts and Sciences. In 1818, Prescott purchased 50 shares of the Suffolk Bank, a clearinghouse bank on State Street in Boston. He married Catherine Greene Hickling, a daughter of Thomas Hickling, for many years United States consul at the Azores. Their son William H. Prescott became a well-known historian.

Notes

References
 
 

People from colonial Boston
Massachusetts Federalists
Massachusetts state senators
Members of the Massachusetts House of Representatives
Fellows of the American Academy of Arts and Sciences
Harvard University alumni
1844 deaths
1762 births
People from Pepperell, Massachusetts